William MacDowall Colhoun (1740–1821) was a British politician and the member of Parliament for Bedford from 1784 to 1802.

See also
 List of MPs in the first United Kingdom Parliament

References

1740 births
1821 deaths
British MPs 1784–1790
British MPs 1790–1796
British MPs 1796–1800
members of the Parliament of Great Britain for English constituencies
members of the Parliament of the United Kingdom for English constituencies
UK MPs 1801–1802